Volcano House is a geology exhibition in Reykjavík, Iceland, located at Tryggvagata 11.
The exhibition gives a brief overview of Iceland's geological history and volcanic systems. 
Every hour the Volcano House shows two documentaries, one about the volcanic eruption of Eyjafjallajökull in 2010 and one about the volcanic eruption in the Westman Islands in 1973. The mission of Volcano House is to give visitors a glimpse of the reality of living in Iceland, where volcanoes and earthquakes are a part of daily life.

Admission to the geology exhibition is free, but the documentary cinema is requires paid tickets.

History
Volcano House was established in 2011 by the siblings Hörður Gunnarsson, Þórir Gunnarsson, Svavar Gunnarsson, Dagbjört 
Gunnarsdóttir  and their families.
According to the official website, the Volcano House closed "indefinitely" as of January 15, 2020.

Dóra Magnúsdóttir is the general manager of Volcano House. Dóra is a Geographer with 25 years of experience in Icelandic tourism. Other staff members are for example Geologists, Geographers and tour guides.

Exhibition
A brief synopsis of Iceland's geological history and volcanic system are displayed in the Volcano House, together with  photographs of the volcanic eruptions and other aspects of Icelandic nature. Volcano House offers a hands-on geology exhibition where guests can handle various samples of pumice, ash and lava from Icelandic volcanoes, for example ash from Eyjafjallajökull and Grímsvötn and pumice from Hekla. A collection of semi-precious rocks and minerals from around the country are also on display, and are available for purchase. Rocks on display are for example Jaspis, Opal, Obsidian, Rock crystal and Iceland spar. Volcano House offers guidance and information throughout the exhibit.

The interior design of the exhibition intended to evoke the style of 1973, the year when the volcanic eruption in Heimaey in the Westman Islands occurred.

Cinema
The Volcano House cinema presents two documentaries covering two of the most powerful volcanic eruptions that have  occurred in Iceland over the last 40 years - the 1973 eruption in Heimaey on the Westman Islands, and the 2010 eruption of Eyjafjallajökull in South Iceland. The documentaries are exclusively made for Volcano House and can not be shown anywhere else. Each screening is about 55 minutes and starts with a short personal introduction on Volcanology in Iceland. The films are shown every hour from 09:00 to 21:00. The films are also available in German, French and Icelandic. In the summertime the films are shown in German and French but from September until May they are shown in other languages upon request.

References

External links
Volcano House official website

Museums in Reykjavík
Geology museums in Iceland
Tourist attractions in Iceland
Volcanology